Li Tu (born 27 May 1996) is an Australian tennis player who mainly competes on the ITF Men's World Tennis Tour.

Tu has career-high rankings by the ATP of 190 in singles, reached on 17 October 2022, and 204 in doubles, achieved on 1 August 2022.

He made his ATP Tour debut at the 2021 Murray River Open, where he received a wildcard into the singles main draw.

Career

2011–2014: Debut and retirement
Tu made his ITF Futures debut in February 2011 at the Australia F2. He played four other tournaments, losing in the first round in all.

Tu competed in the 2012 Junior Davis Cup alongside Thanasi Kokkinakis, later working as a tennis coach prior to his debut on the senior tour.

In February 2014, he won his first match on ITF-level. In April 2014, Tu reached the quarterfinal of the Australia F5, his best result this level, but retired in June 2014.

2020–2021: Return, ATP and major debut, four ITF titles
In 2020, Tu was inspired to return to playing tennis and enjoyed success on the Australian UTR Pro Tennis Series.

Tu made his Grand Slam debut at the 2021 Australian Open, after receiving a wildcard. He lost in the first round to Feliciano López.

In August 2021, Tu won his first ITF title as an unranked qualifier at a M15 tournament in Tunisia. He was competing in his first international event since June 2014.

In September 2021, Tu won the singles and doubles titles at a tournament in Monastir, Tunisia.

Tu ended the season with an ATP ranking of No. 521.

2022: Maiden Challenger title, top 200 debut
Tu lost in the first round of the 2022 Australian Open – Men's singles qualifying. He made his Grand Slam debut in doubles and reached the third round after receiving a wildcard with Dane Sweeny.

In May, he scooped an ITF title in Cairo and finished runner-up at another ITF event at Monastir, winning 11 of his past 12 matches. He raised 55 places to a new career-high of world No. 342 on 9 May 2022.

In July, Tu made his debut on the ATP Challenger Tour in Rome, Georgia, USA, where he lost to Yasutaka Uchiyama. The following week in Indianapolis, as an alternate, he won his first Challenger match against Michail Pervolarakis, but lost to Dominik Koepfer in the second round. He then made his first Challenger quarterfinal in Winnipeg, defeating seventh seed Gijs Brouwer in the second round, before losing to Enzo Couacaud.  As a result he reached world No. 252 on 1 August 2022.

In October, Tu made his first Challenger semifinal in Seoul after qualifying by beating Cho Se-hyuk and Mukund Sasikumar. In the main draw, he beat Kaichi Uchida, fellow qualifier Naoki Nakagawa and the fifth seed, compatriot Christopher O'Connell. He defeated the sixth seed, compatriot James Duckworth in the semifinals to reach his first Challenger final. He defeated Wu Yibing in straight sets in the final. As a result, he moved more than 100 positions up inside the top 200 in the rankings at world No. 190 on 17 October 2022.

ATP Challenger and ITF World Tour finals

Singles: 10 (8–2)

Doubles: 5 (4–1)

References

External links

Li Tu at Tennis Australia
Li Tu at Universal Tennis

1996 births
Living people
Australian male tennis players
Tennis players from Adelaide